Brinson James Wright (born August 5, 1989), who goes by the stage name Brinson, is an American Christian hip hop rapper. He has released ten studio albums since 2008.

Early life
Wright was born Brinson James Wright, on August 5, 1989 in Jacksonville, Florida, to Gerald and Marion Wright. He attendedBelmont University in Nashville, Tennessee to study in their Music Business department.

Music career
Brinson's music career started in 2006, as he released his first studio album, Escaping Me, on September 23 of that year, from GodChaserz Entertainment. The subsequent studio album, OMG, was released on November 2, 2010, by GodChaserz Entertainment. His third studio album, No Other Heroes, was released October 23, 2012, from GodChaserz Entertainment. He released, Until We Meet Again, on August 4, 2015, with GodChaserz Entertainment.

He is part of the rap collective All the King's Men, with CStraight and ReadyWriter, and they released their first album, All the King's Men, on September 30, 2014, from GodChaserz Entertainment, where Brinson is the sole operator.

Ministry
He is currently a podcast host of the GodChaserz Podcast on iTunes. Also, Brinson hosts an event called "Beyond Christmas" every December, where he has coordinated donations of over 20,000 toys and spending over $300,000 in support of local hospitals in Jacksonville, Fl.

Film 
GodChaserz The Documentary" is a powerful film that showcases the journey of Brinson, a Christian rapper, as he navigates the challenges of the music industry while staying true to his faith. Brinson not only stars in the documentary but also co-directed it with Will Thomas. The film provides an intimate look into GodChaserz Entertainment and it's artists.

The film has received widespread acclaim, winning over 60 awards in film festivals all over the world. Its success is a testament to the powerful message it delivers and the exceptional filmmaking skills of Brinson and Will Thomas. "GodChaserz The Documentary" is a must-watch for anyone who is passionate about music, faith, and the power of perseverance. It offers a rare glimpse into the challenges faced by independent artists and the importance of staying true to one's beliefs in the face of adversity.

Discography

Albums
 Escaping Me (September 23, 2008)
 OMG (November 2, 2010)
 No Other Heroes (October 23, 2012)
 All the King's Men (July 22, 2014)
 Until We Meet Again (August 4, 2015)
 BLACK CANVAS: UWMA 2 (June 3, 2016)
 Thornz: UWMA 3 (August 25, 2017)
  Vibranium  ( February 16, 2018)
  Reversing Tomorrow ( April 25, 2019)
  Throw The Crown ( July 24, 2020)
 Before He Cracks The Sky (July 21, 2022)

References

External links
 Official website
 Official website
 New Release Today artist profile
 Holy Hip Hop DataBase profile
 Official Documentary website

1989 births
Living people
African-American male rappers
African-American Christians
Musicians from Jacksonville, Florida
American performers of Christian hip hop music
Rappers from Florida
Belmont University alumni
21st-century American rappers
21st-century American male musicians
21st-century African-American musicians
20th-century African-American people